Old Man Drinking a Glass of Beer (AKA: Comic Faces) is a 1897 British short  silent comedy film, directed by George Albert Smith, featuring a man drinking a glass of beer whose face and hands become increasingly lively as a result. The single-shot film shows comedian Tom Green, according to Bryony Dixon of BFIfilms, "performing what is known as a 'facial', that is a piece direct to camera showing  changing facial expressions. The ability to get close up to the star was a great advantage that film had over the stage and early filmmakers were keen to exploit it."

References

External links

 Movie on YouTube

1897 films
1890s British films
British black-and-white films
British silent short films
Films directed by George Albert Smith
British comedy short films
Films about beer
Articles containing video clips
1897 comedy films
1897 short films
Silent comedy films